Britt Ummels (born 24 August 1993) is a Dutch athlete. She competed in the women's 800 metres event at the 2021 European Athletics Indoor Championships.

References

External links

1993 births
Living people
Dutch female middle-distance runners
Place of birth missing (living people)
20th-century Dutch women
21st-century Dutch women